Macy Chan (Chinese:陳美詩, born 22 February 1981) is a Hong Kong actress and singer.

Filmography

TV series

Film

Personal life 
On 4 May 2017, Macy Chan married Eric Suen in Los Angeles after eight years of dating.

References

External links
Official TVB Blog of Macy Chan
Macy Chan on Sina Weibo

88news.net

1981 births
Living people
21st-century Hong Kong actresses
21st-century Hong Kong women singers
Hong Kong television actresses
Alumni of the Chinese University of Hong Kong